Douglas Bruce Lenat (born 1950) is the CEO of Cycorp, Inc. of Austin, Texas, and has been a prominent researcher in artificial intelligence. Lenat was awarded the biannual IJCAI Computers and Thought Award in 1976 for creating the machine-learning program AM.  He has worked on (symbolic, not statistical) machine learning (with his AM and Eurisko programs),  knowledge representation, "cognitive economy", blackboard systems, and what he dubbed in 1984 "ontological engineering" (with his Cyc program at MCC and, since 1994, at Cycorp).  He has also worked in military simulations, and numerous projects for US government, military, intelligence, and scientific organizations.  In 1980, he published a critique of conventional random-mutation Darwinism.  He authored a series of articles in the Journal of Artificial Intelligence exploring the nature of heuristic rules.

Lenat was one of the original Fellows of the AAAI, and is the only individual to have served on the Scientific Advisory Boards of both Microsoft and Apple.  He is a Fellow of the AAAS, AAAI, and Cognitive Science Society, and an editor of the J. Automated Reasoning, J. Learning Sciences, and J. Applied Ontology. He was one of the founders of TTI/Vanguard in 1991 and remains a member of its advisory board still in 2017.  He was named one of the Wired 25.

Background and education 

Lenat was born in Philadelphia, Pennsylvania, on September 13, 1950, and grew up there and, from ages 5–15, in Wilmington, Delaware.  He attended Cheltenham High School, in Wyncote PA, where his after-school job at the neighboring Beaver College was cleaning rat cages and then goose pens, which motivated him to learn to program as a path to a very different after-school and summer job, and eventually career.

While attending the University of Pennsylvania, Lenat supported himself through programming, notably designing and developing a natural language interface to a U.S. Navy database question–answering system serving as an early online shipboard operations manual used on US aircraft carriers.  He received his bachelor's degree in Mathematics and Physics, and his master's degree in Applied Mathematics, all in 1972, from the University of Pennsylvania.

For his senior thesis, advised in part by Dennis Gabor, was to bounce acoustic waves in the 40 mHz range off real-world objects, record their interference patterns on a 2-meter square plot, photo-reduce those to a 10-mm square film image, shine a laser through the film, and thus project the three-dimensional imaged object—i.e., the first known acoustic hologram. To settle an argument with Dr. Gabor, Lenat computer-generated a five-dimensional hologram, by photo-reducing computer printout of the interference pattern of a globe rotating and expanding over time, reducing the large two-dimensional paper printout to a moderately large 5-cm square film surface through which a conventional laser beam was then able to project a three-dimensional image, which changed in two independent ways (rotating and changing in size) as the film was moved up-down or left-right.

Lenat was a Ph.D. student in Computer Science at Stanford University, where his published research included automatic program synthesis from input/output pairs and from natural language clarification dialogues.

Research
He received his Ph.D. in Computer Science from Stanford University (published as Knowledge-based systems in artificial intelligence, along with the Ph.D. thesis of Randall Davis, McGraw-Hill, 1982) in 1976. His thesis advisor was Professor Cordell Green, and his thesis/oral committee included Professors Edward Feigenbaum, Joshua Lederberg, Paul Cohen, Allen Newell, Herbert Simon, Bruce Buchanan, John McCarthy, and Donald Knuth.

His thesis, AM (Automated Mathematician) was one of the first computer programs that attempted to make discoveries, i.e., to be a theorem proposer rather than a theorem prover. Experimenting with the program fueled a cycle of criticism and improvement, leading to a slightly deeper understanding of human creativity. Many issues had to be dealt with in constructing such a program: how to represent knowledge formally, expressively, and concretely, how to program hundreds of heuristic "interestingness" rules to judge the worth of new discoveries, heuristics for when to reason symbolically and inductively (and slowly) versus when to reason statistically from frequency data (and hence, quickly), what the architecture—the design constraints—of such reasoning programs might be, why heuristics work (in sum, because the future is a continuous function of the past), and what their "inner structure'' might be. AM was one of the first halting steps toward a science of learning by discovery, toward de-mystifying the creative process and demonstrating that computer programs can make novel and creative discoveries.

In 1976 Lenat started teaching as an assistant professor of Computer Science at Carnegie Mellon and commenced his work on the AI program Eurisko. The limitation with AM was that it was locked into following a fixed set of interestingness heuristics; Eurisko, by contrast, represented its heuristic rules as first class objects and hence it could explore, manipulate, and discover new heuristics just as it (and AM) explored, manipulated, and discovered new domain concepts.

Lenat returned to Stanford as an assistant professor of Computer Science in 1978 and continued his research building the Eurisko automated discovery and heuristic-discovery program. Eurisko made many interesting discoveries and enjoyed significant acclaim, with Lenat's paper "Heuretics: Theoretical and Experimental Study of Heuristic Rules" winning the Best Paper award at the 1982 AAAI conference.

A call for "common sense"
Lenat (working with John Seely Brown at Xerox PARC) published in 1984 an analysis of what were the limitations of his AM and Eurisko lines of research.  It concluded that progress toward real, general, symbolic AI would require a vast knowledge base of "common sense", suitably formalized and represented, and an inference engine capable of finding tens- or hundreds-deep conclusions and arguments that followed from the application of that knowledge base to specific questions and applications.

The successes, and analysis of the limitations, of this AM and Eurisko approach to AI, and the concluding plea for the massive (multi-thousand-person-year, decades-long) R&D effort would be required to break that bottleneck to AI, led to attention in 1982 from Admiral Bob Inman and the then-forming MCC research consortium in Austin, Texas, culminating in Lenat's becoming Principal Scientist of MCC from 1984–1994, though he continued even after this period to return to Stanford to teach approximately one course per year.  At the 400-person MCC, Lenat was able to have several dozen researchers work on that common sense knowledge base, rather than just a few graduate students.

Cycorp
The fruits of the first decade of R&D on Cyc were spun out of MCC into a company, Cycorp, at the end of 1994. In 1986, he estimated the effort to complete Cyc would be at least 250,000 rules and 1,000 person-years of effort, probably twice that, and by 2017, he and his team had spent about 2,000 person-years of effort building Cyc, creating approximately 24 million rules and assertions (not counting "facts"). Lenat emphasizes that he and his 60-person R&D team strive to keep those numbers as small as possible; even the number of one-step inferences in Cyc's deductive closure is in the hundreds of trillions.

, Lenat continues his work on Cyc as CEO of Cycorp. While the first decade of work on Cyc (1984–1994) was funded by large American companies pooling long-term research funds to compete with the Japanese Fifth Generation Computer Project, and the second decade (1995-2006) of work on Cyc was funded by US government agencies' research contracts, the third decade up through the present (2007–present) has been largely supported through commercial applications of Cyc, including in the financial services, energy, and healthcare areas.

Among the recent Cyc applications, one unusual one, MathCraft, involves helping middle-school students more deeply understand math.  Most people have had the experience where we thought we understood something, but only really understood it when we had to explain or teach it to someone else. Despite that, almost all AI-aided instruction has the AI play the role of the teacher. In contrast, Mathcraft has the AI, Cyc, play the role of a fellow student who is always very slightly more confused than you, the user, are. As you give MathCraft good advice, it allows that avatar to make fewer mistakes of that kind, and from the point of the user it seems as though they have taught it something. This sort of Learning by Teaching paradigm may have broad applications in future domains where training is involved.

Quotes 

 "Intelligence is ten million rules."<ref>{{Cite journal|last=Lenat|first=Douglas|date=1988|title=The Case for Inelegance|journal=Proceedings of the International Workshop on Artificial Intelligence for Industrial Applications, Tokyo, May 1988.}}</ref> This refers to the prior and tacit knowledge that authors presume their readers all possess (such as "if person x knows person y, then x's date of death can't be earlier than y's date of birth") not counting the vastly larger number of "facts" such as one might find in Wikipedia or by Googling. "The time may come when a greatly expanded Cyc will underlie countless software applications. But reaching that goal could easily take another two decades."
 "Once you have a truly massive amount of information integrated as knowledge, then the human-software system will be superhuman, in the same sense that mankind with writing (or language itself) is superhuman compared to mankind before writing (or language itself). We look back on pre-linguistic cavemen and think 'they weren't quite human, were they?'  In much the same way, our descendants will look back on pre-AI homo sapiens with exactly that mixture of otherness and pity."
 "Sometimes the veneer of intelligence is not enough."
 “If computers were human, they’d present themselves as autistic, schizophrenic, or otherwise brittle. It would be unwise or dangerous for that person to take care of children and cook meals, but it’s on the horizon for home robots. That’s like saying, ‘We have an important job to do, but we’re going to hire dogs and cats to do it.'”
 "What we needed, he says, is nothing less than an “AI Manhattan Project”, a full frontal assault on common sense: the challenge is to create an Encyclopédia of Common sense", Michiu Kaku citing Lenat.

 Writings 

 "Why AM and Eurisko Appear to Work," (Lenat and John Seely Brown), Proceedings of National Conference on AI (AAAI–83), Washington, DC, August 1983.
 
 
 Lenat, Douglas B. "Computer Software for Intelligent Systems:  An Underview of AI," in Scientific American, September 1984.
 Lenat, Douglas B.; Clarkson, Albert; Kircmidjian, Garo (1983). "An Expert System for Indications & Warning Analysis". Proceedings of the Eighth International Joint Conference on Artificial Intelligence - Volume 1. IJCAI'83. San Francisco, CA, USA: Morgan Kaufmann Publishers Inc.: 259–262.
 Lenat, Douglas B.; Feigenbaum, Edward A. (February 1991). "On the Thresholds of Knowledge". Artif. Intell. 47 (1-3): 185–250. doi:10.1016/0004-3702(91)90055-O. ISSN 0004-3702.
 Lenat, Douglas B.; Guha, R. V. (1990-01-01). Building Large Knowledge-Based Systems: Representation and Inference in the Cyc Project. Reading, Mass.: Addison-Wesley. .
 Lenat, Douglas B.  From 2001 to 2001: Common Sense and the Mind of HAL Lenat, Douglas B. (2008-07-10). "The Voice of the Turtle: Whatever Happened to AI?". AI Magazine. 29(2). doi:10.1609/aimag.v29i2.2106. ISSN 0738-4602
 Blackstone E.H., Lenat, D.B. and Ishwaran H. Infrastructure required to learn which care is best: methods that need to be developed,  in (Olsen L., Grossman, C., and McGinnis, M., eds.) Learning What Works: Infrastructure Required for Comparative Effectiveness Research. Institute of Medicine Learning Health System Series, The National Academies Press, pp. 123–144, 2011.
 Lenat DB, Durlach P.  “Reinforcing Math Knowledge by Immersing Students in a Simulated Learning-By-Teaching Experience.”   J. International Journal of Artificial Intelligence in Education., 2014
 Lenat, Douglas B. (2016-04-13). "WWTS (What Would Turing Say?)". AI Magazine''. 37 (1): 97–101. doi:10.1609/aimag.v37i1.2644. ISSN 0738-4602 
 See also many of the References, below.

References

External links 
 Douglas Lenat bio page at Cyc.com 
 "Beyond the Semantic Web" video lecture at NIPS 2008.
 "How David Beats Goliath" article at The New Yorker.

Fellows of the Association for the Advancement of Artificial Intelligence
Fellows of the American Association for the Advancement of Science
1950 births
Living people
Artificial intelligence researchers
Lisp (programming language) people
American computer businesspeople
Fellows of the Cognitive Science Society
Stanford University School of Engineering alumni
University of Pennsylvania alumni